The Scheibe SF 28 Tandem-Falke (English: "falcon") is a German motorglider that was designed by Egon Scheibe in 1970 and which flew for the first time in May the following year. It was a development of the Scheibe Falke with (as its name suggests) seating in tandem rather than side-by-side as in the original Falke design.

Development
The SF 28 is a low-wing, cantilever monoplane of conventional design with a large perspex canopy. The undercarriage consists of a non-retractable monowheel and a steerable tailwheel, linked to the rudder. Small outrigger wheels are fitted to nylon legs under each wing. The fuselage is of steel tube construction, covered in fabric and the wings are constructed of wood and fabric around a single spar.

Operational history
Scheibe entered at least one Tandem-Falke in the German Motor Glider Competition of 1977.
At least one SF28 was used by the Spanish military as 'UE 16-1' and demobilized in April 2008.

Specifications (SF 28A)

See also

Notes

References

Further reading

External links 

 Picture of the Spanish UE 16-1 - 

Scheibe
1970s German sailplanes
Motor gliders
Single-engined tractor aircraft
Low-wing aircraft
Aircraft first flown in 1971